Jeenmata is a village in Sikar district of Rajasthan, India. It is located at a distance of 29 km from Sikar town in south. There is an ancient Temple dedicated to Shree Jeen Mataji (Goddess of Power). Millions of devotees come here during Navaratri.
There are a number of dharamshalas to accommodate large number of visitors.

Jeenmata temple is situated near the hill 10 km from village Rewasa. The temple of Jeen Mataji is around 108 km from Jaipur. It is surrounded by thick forest. Its full name was Jayanti Mata. The temple was constructed around 1200 years ago. The temple of Jeen Mataji was a place of pilgrimage from early times and was repaired and rebuilt several times.

Jeen Mata's main followers include the Vaisya (Khandelwal) Acharya, Brahmins, Lohar, Yadavs / Ahir, Jat, Rajputs, Khandelwal, Agarwal, Jangir and Meenas along with Baniyas of the Shekhawati area. Jeen Mataji is the kuldevi of Acharya(आचार्य ) / Brahmins, Yadavs / Ahir, Khandelwal,Agarwal, Sonawane, Kasliwal, Bakliwal, Meena, Jats, Shekhawati Rajputs (Shekhawat & Rao Rajputs and other Rajput residing in Shekhawati area),mali and Jangir, of Rajasthan.

The other famous temple of Sikar District, Khatushyamji is at a distance of twenty-six kilometers.

References

External links 

Delimitation Commission Report
Villages in the Danta Ramgarh tehsil, Sikar district
http://sikar.nic.in/jeen_mata.htm
Delimitation Commission Report
Jeen Mata Temple - The Divine India

Hindu temples in Rajasthan
Villages in Sikar district
Tourist attractions in Sikar district